Per Bjørnø (28 May 1927 – 2 March 1979) was a Norwegian footballer. He played in nine matches for the Norway national football team from 1949 to 1951.

References

External links
 
 

1927 births
1979 deaths
Norwegian footballers
Norway international footballers
Place of birth missing
Association football midfielders
FK Ørn-Horten players